The 2006–07 Slovenian Football Cup was the 16th season of the Slovenian Football Cup, Slovenia's football knockout competition. 20 lower league teams played in the first two rounds and the Slovenian PrvaLiga teams joined in the Round of 16.

Qualified clubs

2006–07 Slovenian PrvaLiga members
Bela Krajina
Celje
Domžale
Drava Ptuj
Factor
Gorica
Koper
Maribor
Nafta Lendava
Primorje

Additional place: Rudar Velenje

Qualified through MNZ Regional Cups
MNZ Ljubljana:  Zagorje, Svoboda Kisovec, Ihan
MNZ Maribor: Malečnik, Pohorje, Paloma
MNZ Celje: Mons Claudius, Krško
MNZ Koper: Postojna, Bonifika
MNZ Nova Gorica: Adria, Brda
MNZ Murska Sobota: Veržej, Mura 05
MNZ Lendava: Črenšovci, Renkovci
MNZG-Kranj: Zarica, Lesce
MNZ Ptuj: Stojnci, Zavrč

First round

|}

Second round

|}

Round of 16

|}

Quarter-finals

|}

Semi-finals

|}

Final

References

 

Slovenian Football Cup seasons
Slovenian Cup
Cup